Mount Pleasant, also known as the Samuel Cahoon House, is a historic home located near Smyrna, Kent County, Delaware.  It built about 1810, and consists of a two-story, five-bay, gable-roofed brick main house with an interior brick chimney stack at either gable end and a one-story, gable-roofed brick kitchen wing.  It is in a late Georgian / Federal vernacular style and measures 43 feet by 25 feet.  Also on the property are a contributing early 19th-century smokehouse and barn.

It was listed on the National Register of Historic Places in 1992.

References

Houses on the National Register of Historic Places in Delaware
Georgian architecture in Delaware
Federal architecture in Delaware
Houses completed in 1810
Houses in Kent County, Delaware
National Register of Historic Places in Kent County, Delaware